Guiqing is a given name of Chinese origin. Notable people with the name include:

Rong Guiqing (born 1958), Chinese major general
Zhong Guiqing (born 1977), Chinese pole vaulter

Chinese given names